The Northern Ontario Junior Hockey League (NOJHL) is a Canadian Junior ice hockey league and member of the Canadian Junior Hockey League and Northern Ontario Hockey Association.  The winner of the NOJHL playoffs competes for the Dudley Hewitt Cup with the winners of the Ontario Junior Hockey League and the Superior International Junior Hockey League. The winner of the Dudley Hewitt Cup then moves on to compete for the Royal Bank Cup.

The modern NOJHL
The current incarnation of the NOJHL comprises twelve teams located in Ontario and Michigan.  The teams are currently located in: Blind River, Cochrane, Elliot Lake, Espanola, Hearst, Kirkland Lake, Noelville, Powassan, Rayside-Balfour, Sault Ste. Marie, Ontario, Sault Ste. Marie, Michigan, and Timmins the league is spread across the southern region of Northeastern Ontario.

The current NOJHL origins were in 1970 when the previous NOJHL was unstable footing while competing as a Junior "A" league.  In Southern Ontario, the Ontario Major Junior Hockey League was looking to expand north and the league's two top teams, the Sudbury Wolves and Sault Ste. Marie Greyhounds, accepted an invitation from the Ontario Major Junior Hockey League to compete in the higher league. The next best team, the North Bay Trappers, then chose to leave and joined the Ontario Hockey Association's new Ontario Provincial Junior A Hockey League.  With the top tier of talent gone, the only remaining team in the league was the Chelmsford Canadiens.  A season before, the Espanola Screaming Eagles had been a member of the league, but opted to drop to the NOHA Jr. B Hockey League in 1971; the Canadiens joined them in 1972.

The NOHA Jr. B Hockey League was formed in 1970 with a North and South division and teams in Capreol, Levak, Kapuskasing, amongst others.  In their first season, the Capreol Hawks won the league championship.  In 1971, Espanola jumped on board, followed by Chelmsford in 1972.  In 1973, the Canadians moved to Rayside-Balfour and became the Canadians.  The Onaping Falls Huskies moved from Levack in 1974, and the Nickel Centre Native Sons, Coniston Flyers, and Sudbury North Stars joined in 1976 when the NOHA merged their small Juvenile league into Jr. B.

In 1978, the top teams of the NOHA Jr. B Hockey League created the Northern Ontario Junior Hockey League and were promoted to Tier II Junior "A".  With the five former Jr. "B" clubs and the Sudbury Cubs, the league was back in action.  In 1981, the Elliot Lake Vikings jumped into the fold.  In 1983, the Onaping Falls Huskies dropped out despite winning three league titles in the past four seasons.  After a one-season hiatus, they came back for two more years and then folded for good.  In 1986, Rayside-Balfour went on hiatus and Capreol folded, dropping the league down to four teams.  The Ontario Provincial Junior A Hockey League, also down to four teams, operated with the NOJHL as essentially two divisions of the same league.  With an interlocking schedule, the NOJHL survived the 1986–87 season, the OPJHL did not and folded after the season concluded.  Also, after 8 years of trying and failing, an NOJHL champion defeated an OPJHL champion for the Ontario Hockey Association championship.  The Nickel Centre Power Trains defeated the Owen Sound Greys 4-games-to-2 for the right to compete for the Dudley Hewitt Cup—the Central Canadian Junior "A" Championship.  The next year, the Canadians were back and a new team known as the Thessalon Flyers entered the league.  In 1988, the Haileybury 54's joined the league and in 1989 so did the Rouyn-Noranda Capitales.  Thessalon folded in 1990, Haileybury moved to Powassan in 1991 and the Timmins Golden Bears joined as well.  A season later, Sudbury became Nickel Centre and then later folded.  In 1994, Powassan moved to Sturgeon Falls and the Parry Sound Shamrocks joined the league.  In 1996, Rouyn-Noranda folded to make way for a new Quebec Major Junior Hockey League team that was moving to their town.  In 1999, Timmins moved to Iroquois Falls, Elliot Lake moved to Nickel Centre, and the Soo Thunderbirds were founded.  Also in 1999, Parry Sound moved to a new OPJHL (founded in 1993).  A year later, Nickel Centre moved to Blind River and the Sudbury Northern Wolves were founded.  In 2002, Sturgeon Falls moved to North Bay.  A season after that, a team from Manitoulin joined and Espanola jumped over to Sault Ste. Marie, Michigan.  Finally, in 2005, the league's most dominant team in history and the last remaining shred of the original NOJHL, Rayside-Balfour, folded.  They did not go without leaving their mark. Early in the 2005–06 season, the Sudbury Northern Wolves became heavily involved with the OHL's Sudbury Wolves and the Northern Wolves became the Sudbury Jr. Wolves. The remaining players from the Rayside-Balfour Sabrecats joined the Jr. Wolves. From 1996 until 2002, the Rayside-Balfour Sabrecats won 7 straight NOJHL Championships, three Dudley Hewitt Cups, and once came within one win of winning the Royal Bank Cup as national champions.

There were six teams in the NOJHL as of 2007. The 2006–07 league champions, the Soo Indians, took a year off in an attempt to sell the franchise.  A year later, in 2008, they came back as the Soo Eagles.  Also, in the summer of 2008, the Temiscaming Royals jumped from the Greater Metro Junior A Hockey League to the NOJHL to expand the league to eight teams.  Temiscaming was the second Québécois team in NOJHL history, after the Rouyn-Noranda Capitales who were in the league from 1989 to 1996.  In the spring of 2011, the Royals failed to find new ownership and folded. The Manitoulin Islanders left Little Current, Ontario at the end of the 2010–11 season and relocated to Kirkland Lake, Ontario. At the same time, Temiscaming Royals owner Steve McCharles was attempting to sell his team, but folded after a deal fell through with a group from Kirkland Lake.

With the Manitoulin Islanders relocated to Kirkland Lake, the team became the Kirkland Lake Blue Devils to commemorate the 1940 Allan Cup champions by the same team name. However, in December 2011, the Blue Devils were folding mid-season as a result of owner Bob Kasner being suspended for 6 months for roster violations. Days later, a new group came and created the Kirkland Lake Gold Miners to keep the team in the league.

During the 2011–12 season, the NOJHL implemented concussion safety policy and drug testing programs.  The NOJHL is the first league in Canadian Junior A hockey to target either of these hot button issues.

In 2012, the Soo Thunderbirds became only the second NOJHL franchise to qualify for the Royal Bank Cup, ending a 10-year drought that saw no NOJHL franchise at the Royal Bank Cup, despite making the Dudley-Hewitt Cup finals three times since the round-robin format in 2002. Over the summer of 2012, the Sudbury Jr. Wolves severed ties with the OHL's Wolves and became the Sudbury Cubs, and that moniker only lasted one season and became the Sudbury Nickel Barons. The Michigan-based Soo Eagles would also leave to join the USA Hockey Tier II North American Hockey League.

In 2013, the NOJHL granted expansion to Espanola. A community that have been without an NOJHL team since 2003 when the Screaming Eagles relocated to Northern Michigan. The re-addition brought the league up to 8 teams - the most since the 2004–05 season. The North Bay Trappers relocated out of North Bay to Mattawa at the end of the 2013–14 season and became the Mattawa Blackhawks because the Trappers were denied a lease renewal with West Ferris Arena and also because of the thriving OHL market with the North Bay Battalion. The Espanola Rivermen were added to the NOJHL for 2013–14, but left after one season to join the non-Hockey Canada sanctioned Canadian International Hockey League. The Elliot Lake Bobcats relocated to Cochrane, Ontario and became the Cochrane Crunch, who became the league's most-northern team. Weeks later, the Elliot Lake market was replaced with the Elliot Lake Wildcats.

Over the summer of 2015, the league saw the resurrection of the Rayside-Balfour Canadians, who were the Sudbury Nickel Barons from 2012 to 2015. The Sudbury Nickel Barons, for the second time pulled out of hosting the Dudley-Hewitt Cup due to the relocation and the lack of support in the community. The 2016 tournament was allocated to Kirkland Lake, Ontario and hosted by the Kirkland Lake Gold Miners. The Abitibi Eskimos left Iroquois Falls after 13 years to move to Timmins and become the Timmins Rock. Mattawa, the smallest market in the NOJHL lost the Mattawa Blackhawks to Iroquois Falls to replace the departed Abitibi Eskimos and became known as the Iroquois Falls Eskimos. The league grew to 10 teams with the addition of the French River Rapids of Noelville, Ontario. Weeks after the French River Rapids joined the league, the Espanola Express joined the league putting membership to a record 11 teams - the most the league has carried. In May 2015, the Soo Eagles of the North American Hockey League applied and were approved to return to the NOJHL after leaving in 2012 due to the Michigan-based NAHL teams either folding or relocating.

In April 2017, the Iroquois Falls Eskis announced they were moving to Hearst, Ontario, and became the Hearst Lumberjacks.

Teams

{| cellpadding="0"
|-  style="text-align:left; vertical-align:top;"
|
|

{
  "type": "FeatureCollection",
  "features": [
    {
      "type": "Feature",
      "properties": {},
      "geometry": {
        "type": "Point",
        "coordinates": [
          -84.35275266878308,
          46.490939326528014
        ]
      }
    },
    {
      "type": "Feature",
      "properties": {},
      "geometry": {
        "type": "Point",
        "coordinates": [
          -84.31430052034558,
          46.51740600672288
        ]
      }
    },
    {
      "type": "Feature",
      "properties": {},
      "geometry": {
        "type": "Point",
        "coordinates": [
          -82.97396848909558,
          46.18849842597743
        ]
      }
    },
    {
      "type": "Feature",
      "properties": {},
      "geometry": {
        "type": "Point",
        "coordinates": [
          -82.64575193636121,
          46.3811543749733
        ]
      }
    },
    {
      "type": "Feature",
      "properties": {},
      "geometry": {
        "type": "Point",
        "coordinates": [
          -81.76684568636121,
          46.26260401658976
        ]
      }
    },
    {
      "type": "Feature",
      "properties": {},
      "geometry": {
        "type": "Point",
        "coordinates": [
          -81.19143675081433,
          46.57124479319768
        ]
      }
    },
    {
      "type": "Feature",
      "properties": {},
      "geometry": {
        "type": "Point",
        "coordinates": [
          -81.3284911774099,
          48.47859613551645
        ]
      }
    },
    {
      "type": "Feature",
      "properties": {},
      "geometry": {
        "type": "Point",
        "coordinates": [
          -83.66033932194115,
          49.694492462831455
        ]
      }
    },
    {
      "type": "Feature",
      "properties": {},
      "geometry": {
        "type": "Point",
        "coordinates": [
          -81.0483398102224,
          49.065078809510155
        ]
      }
    },
    {
      "type": "Feature",
      "properties": {},
      "geometry": {
        "type": "Point",
        "coordinates": [
          -80.05133053287865,
          48.146144393819895
        ]
      }
    },
    {
      "type": "Feature",
      "properties": {},
      "geometry": {
        "type": "Point",
        "coordinates": [
          -79.35369869694115,
          46.08107400736398
        ]
      }
    },
    {
      "type": "Feature",
      "properties": {},
      "geometry": {
        "type": "Point",
        "coordinates": [
          -80.42912292061375,
          46.13324614330179
        ]
      }
    }
  ]
}

Copeland-McNamara Trophy and Division Champions

In 2008–09, the NOJHL instituted divisions.  Overall champions are bolded.

Dudley Hewitt Cup Central Canadian Champions

Trophy gallery

Former teams

Notable alumni
Todd Bertuzzi - Sudbury Cubs 
Brian Savage - Sudbury Cubs
Steve Sullivan - Timmins Golden Bears
Alex Auld - Sturgeon Falls Lynx
Chris Thorburn - Elliot Lake Ice
Jeremy Stevenson - Elliot Lake Vikings
Jake Muzzin - Soo Thunderbirds
Alex Henry - Timmins Golden Bears
Dan Cloutier - Timmins Golden Bears
Trevor Halverson - Thessalon Flyers
Shannon Hope - Elliot Lake Vikings
Lonnie Loach - Haileybury 54's
Tyler Kennedy - Soo Thunderbirds
Derek MacKenzie - Rayside-Balfour Sabrecats
Colin Miller - Soo Thunderbirds
Andrew Desjardins - Espanola Screaming Eagles

League records

Team season
Best Record, One Season:
40-0-0 - Sudbury Cubs, 1989-90
40-0-0 - Rayside-Balfour Sabrecats, 1999-00
Worst Record, One Season:
0-51-0-1 Blind River Beavers 2014-15
Most Goals Scored, One Season:
482 - Rayside-Balfour Canadians, 1991-92
Fewest Goals Scored, One Season:
97 - Rayside-Balfour Sabrecats, 2003-04
Fewest Goals Against, One Season:
80 - Rayside-Balfour Sabrecats, 1999-00
Most Goals Against, One Season:
708 - Elliot Lake Vikings, 1991-92

Team game
Largest margin of victory:
Rayside-Balfour Canadiens 30 - Elliot Lake Vikings 3 on January 28, 1992

Individual season
Most Goals, One Season:
97 - Denis Castonguay, Rayside Balfour Canadians, 1983-84
Most Assists, One Season:
106 - John Stos, Rayside Balfour Canadians, 1991-92
Most Points, One Season:
196 - Denis Castonguay, Rayside Balfour Canadians, 1983-84
Most Penalty Minutes, One Season:
384 - Andy Hodgins, Espanola Eagles, 1991-92
Lowest Goals Against Average, One Season:
1.99 - Justin Dumont, Rayside-Balfour Sabrecats, 1999-00
Most Shutouts, One Season:
9 - Connor Rykman, Soo Thunderbirds, 2015–16

Individual career
Most Games Played, Career:
244 - Matthew Neault, Blind River Beavers/Sudbury Nickel Barons/Rayside-Balfour Canadians, 2013-2018
Most Goals, Career:
197 - Denis Castonguay, Rayside-Balfour Canadians, 1979-84
Most Assists, Career:
237 - Brian Verreault, Rayside-Balfour Canadians, 1979-84
Most Points, Career:
409 - Brian Verreault, Rayside-Balfour Canadians, 1979-84
Most Penalty Minutes, Career:
919 - Dean Bowles, Elliot Lake Vikings, 1986-91

Timeline of teams in the NOJHL
1978 - NOHA Jr. B Hockey League is promoted to Junior A and renamed Northern Ontario Junior Hockey League - League includes: Sudbury Cubs, Nickel Centre Native Sons, Onaping Falls Huskies, Capreol Hawks, Rayside-Balfour Canadians, and Espanola Eagles
1981 - Elliot Lake Vikings join from International Junior B Hockey League
1982 - Sudbury Cubs become Sudbury North Stars
1983 - Onaping Falls Huskies leave league
1983 - Sudbury North Stars return to Sudbury Cubs
1984 - Onaping Falls Huskies rejoin league
1984 - Nickel Centre Native Sons leave league
1985 - Nickel Centre Native Sons rejoin league
1986 - Nickel Centre Native Sons renamed Nickel Centre Power Trains
1986 - Rayside-Balfour Canadians, Capreol Hawks, and Onaping Falls Huskies leave league
1987 - Rayside-Balfour Canadians rejoin league
1987 - Thessalon Flyers join league
1987 - Nickel Centre Power Trains leave league
1988 - Espanola Eagles leave league, franchise sold to Haileybury 54's
1989 - Rouyn-Noranda Capitales join league
1990 - Thessalon Flyers leave league
1990 - Haileybury 54's move and become Powassan Passport
1991 - Timmins Golden Bears and Espanola Eagles join league
1992 - Sudbury Cubs become Nickel Centre Cubs
1992 - Powassan Passport become Powassan Hawks
1993 - Nickel Centre Cubs leave league
1994 - Parry Sound Shamrocks join league
1994 - Powassan Hawks move and are renamed Sturgeon Falls Lynx
1995 - Espanola Eagles leave league
1995 - Rayside-Balfour Canadians renamed Rayside-Balfour Sabrecats
1996 - Rouyn-Noranda Capitales disband to make way for Rouyn-Noranda Huskies of Quebec Major Junior Hockey League
1997 - Elliot Lake Vikings become Elliot Lake Ice
1998 - Espanola Eagles rejoin league
1999 - Timmins Golden Bears relocate and become Iroquois Falls Jr. Eskis
1999 - Soo Thunderbirds join league
1999 - Elliot Lake Ice leave league, franchise sold to Nickel Centre Barons
1999 - Parry Sound Shamrocks move to the Ontario Provincial Junior A Hockey League
2000 - Sudbury Northern Wolves join league
2000 - Nickel Centre Barons move and are renamed Blind River Barons
2001 - Blind River Barons renamed Blind River Beavers
2002 - Iroquois Fals Jr. Eskis are renamed Abitibi Eskimos
2002 - Sturgeon Falls Lynx move to North Bay and become the North Bay Skyhawks
2002 - Soo Thunderbirds are renamed Sault Ste. Marie Jr. Greyhounds
2003 - Espanola Eagles move to St. Ignace, Michigan and become the Northern Michigan Black Bears
2003 - Little Current awarded expansion franchise Manitoulin Wild
2003 - Sault Ste. Marie Jr. Greyhounds return to Soo Thunderbirds
2005 - Manitoulin Wild become Manitoulin Islanders
2005 - Rayside-Balfour Sabrecats are granted a one-year leave of absence
2005 - Sudbury Northern Wolves become Sudbury Jr. Wolves
2006 - Northern Michigan Black Bears are relocated and renamed Soo Indians
2006 - Rayside-Balfour Sabrecats officially fold
2007 - Soo Indians take one-year leave in search of new ownership
2008 - Temiscaming Royals join from Greater Metro Junior A Hockey League
2008 - Soo Indians return, renamed Soo Eagles
2009 - North Bay Skyhawks are renamed North Bay Trappers
2011 - Temiscaming Royals leave league
2011 - Manitoulin Islanders move and become Kirkland Lake Blue Devils
2011 - Sudbury Jr. Wolves are renamed Sudbury Cubs
2012 - Kirkland Lake Blue Devils fold/return as Kirkland Lake Gold Miners
2012 - Soo Eagles leave and join North American Hockey League
2012 - Elliot Lake Bobcats join from Greater Metro Junior A Hockey League
2012 - Sudbury Cubs are renamed Sudbury Nickel Barons
2013 - Espanola Rivermen join league as expansion 
2014 - Espanola Rivermen leave league and join CIHL
2014 - Elliot Lake Bobcats move to Cochrane Ontario and become Cochrane Crunch
2014 - North Bay Trappers move to Mattawa Ontario and become Mattawa Blackhawks
2014 - Elliot Lake Wildcats join league as expansion 
 2014- Powassan Voodoos join league as expansion
 2015- Abitibi Eskimos relocate to Timmins and become Timmins Rock
 2015- Mattawa Blackhawks relocate to Iroquois Falls and become Iroquois Falls Eskis
 2015- Sudbury Nickel Barons relocate to Chelmsford and become Rayside-Balfour Canadians
 2015- French River Rapids join league as expansion
 2015- Espanola Express join league as expansion
 2015- Soo Eagles rejoin league
 2017- Iroquois Falls Eskis relocate to Hearst and become Hearst Lumberjacks

See also
Northern Ontario Hockey Association
Ontario Hockey Federation
Canadian Junior A Hockey League
Hockey Canada

References

External links
NOJHL's Official Website

 
A
Sport in Northern Ontario
Sports leagues established in 1970
A
Canadian Junior Hockey League members
1970 establishments in Ontario